(literally 'church attendance duty') was the legal obligation of the population in Sweden–Finland to attend weekly mass.

The obligation to attend church was abolished in Sweden with the 1809 Instrument of Government, but continued in Finland for some time. At the same time, the formal compulsion to take communion ended. The abolition thus marked a first step towards religious freedom in Sweden.

See also 

 Conventicle Act (Sweden) – law outlawing religious meetings other than those of the state church
 Kyrkoplikt – a historical form of punishment

References

Notes

Sources 

 Sammanfattning ur Staten och trossamfunden, Rättslig reglering (SOU 1997:41)

History of the Church of Sweden
Evangelical Lutheran Church of Finland
History of religion in Finland
History of religion in Sweden

19th century in Finland
19th century in Sweden
Legal history of Sweden